Phruronellus formica is a species of true spider in the family Phrurolithidae. It is found in the United States.

References

Phrurolithidae
Articles created by Qbugbot
Spiders described in 1895